Patrick Zwaanswijk (born 17 January 1975) is a Dutch ex-professional who is retired from professional football. A product of the Ajax Youth Academy, Zwaanswijk retired from professional football in 2013 following a successful career with Ajax FC, FC Utrecht, Oita Trinita, NAC Breda and Central Coast Mariners FC. He has played predominantly as a central defender throughout his career. After his career he played for and captained Southern & Ettalong United in Australia's Central Coast Premier League and Terrigal United.
He is married to Leah Maree Zwaanswijk and has two children (Dominique Louise Zwaanswijk and Angelo Zwaanswijk) from his first marriage. 
He lives in Australia, North Avoca since 2015.

Club career
Zwaanswijk played for 11 seasons in the Dutch Eredivisie 6 years with FC Utrecht and 5 years with NAC Breda.

His professional career started with FC Utrecht where he debuted in the ERE-Divisie against Willem II. (1–0 loss) After 6 years at Utrecht, (4 years UEFA Cup, 3 Amstel Cup Finals and 2 KNVB Cup trophies) he joined Oita Trinita Japan After playing under manager Han Berger in the J-League for 14 months made the family miss Europe. He moved back to Holland NAC Breda where he played in the ERE-Divisie until 2010. With NAC Breda he achieved a 3rd Place in 2008 qualifying for Champions League football. He played 189 games for NAC Breda (UEFA Cup, ERE-Divisie and Amstel Cup).

In 2010, Zwaanswijk moved to Australia to join A-League club Central Coast Mariners. He scored his first goal for the Mariners on 2 October 2010 – a late winner against North Queensland Fury.

Zwaanswijk signed a one-year contract extension with the Mariners for the 2012–13 season in May 2012. He scored the opening goal of the 2013 A-League Grand Final on 22 April 2013, heading in a corner to open the scoring against Western Sydney Wanderers. The Mariners went on to win the game 2–0, with Zwaanswijk suggesting after the match that he was considering retirement.

In May 2013, Zwaanswijk announced he would be retiring from football after the club's 2013 AFC Champions League Round of 16 tie against Guangzhou Evergrande, but would be staying on with the Mariners as coach of the Mariners' youth team in the National Youth League.

Managerial career
The Mariners terminated Zwaanswijk's contract after his side finished last in the 2013–14 National Youth League. Zwaanswijk pursued legal action against the Mariners for wrongful dismissal.

In November 2018, Zwaanswijk was appointed head coach of Hills United in National Premier Leagues NSW 2.

In September 2020, Zwaanswijk was appointed head coach of Western Sydney Wanderers Youth for the remainder of the season in National Premier Leagues NSW.

In August 2022, Zwaanswijk was appointed head coach of Manly United FC men's first grade side for the 2023 season.

Club statistics

Honours
FC Utrecht
 KNVB Cup: 2002–03, 2003–04
Central Coast Mariners
 A-League Champions: 2012–13
 A-League Premiership: 2011–12

References

External links

 Central Coast Mariners profile 

1975 births
Living people
Dutch footballers
Dutch expatriate footballers
Dutch football managers
Dutch expatriate football managers
Association football defenders
FC Utrecht players
Oita Trinita players
Eredivisie players
J1 League players
Expatriate footballers in Japan
Dutch expatriate sportspeople in Japan
NAC Breda players
Footballers from Haarlem
A-League Men players
Central Coast Mariners FC players
Expatriate soccer players in Australia
Central Coast Mariners FC non-playing staff